Zemlianychne is a village in the Bilohirsk Raion of Crimea. Population: 

On 15 March 2014, the body of activist Reşat Amet was found by the police in a forest near the village of Zemlianychne in Bilohirsk Raion about 60 kilometers east of the Crimean capital.

References

Bilohirsk Raion
Villages in Crimea